In the 1989 United Andhra Pradesh Assembly election, Indian National Congress  swept the polls, winning 181 of the 294 seats in the Assembly.[3] As the leader of the Congress Legislature Party, Marri Chenna Reddy was elected the Chief Minister. The TDP won only 74 seats from the 216 seats won by it in 1985 because of so much anti on TDP.[4]
General Elections were held in the same year and resulted in the INC(I) winning in 39 out of 42  Lok Sabha constituencies. Its rival, the TDP won only in 2 Lok Sabha constituencies.

Results

Elected members

References 

State Assembly elections in Andhra Pradesh
1980s in Andhra Pradesh
Andhra Pradesh